Piet Groeneveld (18 August 1924 – 9 November 1990) was a Dutch footballer. He played in three matches for the Netherlands national football team in 1951.

References

External links
 

1924 births
1990 deaths
Dutch footballers
Netherlands international footballers
Place of birth missing
Association footballers not categorized by position